Albert Darling Richardson (September 3, 1864 – October 28, 1937) was an American farmer and politician.

Born in the town of Wyoming, Iowa County, Wisconsin, Richardson went to Dodgeville High School. He was a farmer. Richardson served on the school board. He also served as chairman of the Wyoming Town Board and also served on the Iowa County Board of Supervisors. In 1913, Richardson served in the Wisconsin State Assembly and was a Republican. Richardson died in a hospital in Madison, Wisconsin following an operation.

Notes

1864 births
1937 deaths
People from Wyoming, Iowa County, Wisconsin
Farmers from Wisconsin
School board members in Wisconsin
Mayors of places in Wisconsin
County supervisors in Wisconsin
Republican Party members of the Wisconsin State Assembly